Motherland Party may refer to:

 Motherland Party (Azerbaijan), established 1990
 Motherland (Latvia), established 2004
 Motherland Party (Iran), in the 1940s
 Motherland Party (Moldova)
 Motherland Party (Mongolia), established 1992
 Motherland Party (Turkey), established 1983 
 Motherland (Ukraine), established 2001
 Rodina (political party), or Motherland-National Patriotic Union, Russia
 Electoral Bloc Motherland, Moldova
 Motherland Democratic Coalition, Mongolia

See also
Fatherland Party (disambiguation)
 Motherland Defenders Party, a Ukraine political party
List of generic names of political parties